Fırat University is a public university in Elazığ, Turkey. The university was founded in 1975 and named after the Turkish name of the Euphrates River which originates near Elazığ. Being one of the major academic institutions in the Eastern Turkey, the university has twelve schools, four institutes, one state conservatory, three vocational high schools and twenty one research centers with a strong emphasis on scientific and technological advancement and research.

History
Initially opened as Elazığ Technical College in 1967, and renamed as Elazığ State Academy of Engineering and Architecture, Fırat University was established and gained its current name in 1975 with the School of Veterinary Medicine making up the core program and structure of the university. The School of Veterinary Medicine which was founded in 1970 as a distant school of Ankara University Elazığ.

Affiliations
The university is a member of the Caucasus University Association.

References

 
1975 establishments in Turkey
Educational institutions established in 1975